"Am I Crazy" is a single from the Oxford, UK alternative rock band Little Fish. It was released on 6 May 2010.

It's also featured as one of three Little Fish tracks available for download in Rock Band, along with "Darling Dear", and "Bang Bang". "Am I Crazy" is a free track, and the other two are being sold for half the normal price.

Track listing

Personnel
 Julia "Juju" Sophie: vocals, lead guitar
 Neil "Nez" Greenaway: drums

References

External links

2010 debut singles
Little Fish (band) songs
2010 songs
Custard Records singles